Maevatanana is a district of Betsiboka in Madagascar.

Communes
The district is further divided into 20 communes:

 Ambalajia
 Ambalanjanakomby
 Ambodimanga
 Andriba
 Antanimbary
 Antsiafabositra
 Beanana, Maevatanana
 Bemokotra
 Beratsimanana
 Berivotra
 Madiromirafy
 Maevatanana
 Maevatanana II
 Mahatsinjo
 Mahazoma
 Mangabe
 Maria
 Marokoro
 Morafeno
 Tsararano

Mining
The are important gold mining operations in the district of Maevatanana where 20 kg of gold are extracted weekly.

References 

Districts of Betsiboka